Shal Bakasht Vali (also Romanized as Shāl Bakasht Valī) is a village in Deraz Kola Rural District, Babol Kenar District, Babol County, Mazandaran Province, Iran. At the 2006 census, its population was 16, in 5 families.

References 

Populated places in Babol County